Voula (Greek: Βούλα) is a Greek feminine given name, often a diminutive of the given name Paraskevi.

Notbale people bearing the name Voula include:

Voula Damianakou (1914–2016), Greek author, translator and member of the Greek resistance against Nazi Germany
Voula Papachristou (born 1989), Greek triple jumper and long jumper
Voula Papaioannou (1898–1990), Greek photographer
Voula Patoulidou (born 1965), Greek track and field athlete
Voula Zouboulaki (1924–2015), Greek actress

References

Feminine given names
Greek feminine given names